The 2006 NCAA Bowling Championship was the third annual tournament to determine the national champion of women's NCAA collegiate ten-pin bowling. The tournament was played in Houston, Texas during April 2006.

Fairleigh Dickinson defeated Alabama A&M in the championship match, 4 games to 1, to win their first national title.

The tournament's Most outstanding bowler was Lisa Friscioni from Fairleigh Dickinson. An All-tournament team of five bowlers was also named.

Qualification
Since there is only one national collegiate championship for women's bowling, all NCAA bowling programs (whether from Division I, Division II, or Division III) were eligible. A total of 8 teams were invited to contest this championship, which consisted of a double-elimination style tournament.

Tournament bracket 
Site: Houston, Texas

References

NCAA Bowling Championship
NCAA Bowling Championship
2006 in bowling
2006 in sports in Texas
April 2006 sports events in the United States